Cecil Fleming "Cy" Neighbors (September 23, 1880 – May 20, 1964) was a professional baseball outfielder.

Playing career
Neighbors had played for the minor league Toledo Mud Hens in 1905, and in 1907 he played for Burlington, leading the Iowa State League in hits and runs scored. His one appearance in the major leagues was with the 1908 Pittsburgh Pirates. He played left field, which was player-manager Fred Clarke's position.

In 1910, Neighbors joined the Sioux City Packers, batted .333, and led the Western League in hits, with 206. He also stole 34 bases. The Packers won 108 games and the pennant.

Neighbors later spent five seasons in the Northwestern League. His career ended in 1920.

References

External links
 Statistics and History at Baseball-Reference.com

1880 births
1964 deaths
Major League Baseball outfielders
Pittsburgh Pirates players
Duluth White Sox players
Toledo Mud Hens players
Burlington Pathfinders players
Memphis Egyptians players
Kansas City Blues (baseball) players
Memphis Turtles players
Mobile Sea Gulls players
Sioux City Packers players
Tacoma Tigers players
Spokane Indians players
Seattle Giants players
Vancouver Beavers players
Victoria Islanders players
Baseball players from Missouri